Elsie Ann Windes (born June 17, 1985) is an American water polo player. After playing for the University of California, she joined the United States national team in 2006. She helped the U.S. win a silver medal at the 2008 Summer Olympics and a gold medal at the 2012 Summer Olympics.

Career

High school
Windes played on the water polo team at Beaverton High School. She was the 2003 Oregon State MVP and led her team to the 2003 state championship. She also earned all-league honors three times.

College
Windes started her college career at the University of California in 2004. As a freshman, she scored 33 goals to rank second on the team. She led the Bears in scoring the following year, with 51 goals, and was a third team All-American. In 2006, Windes led the team again, with 40 goals. She was named to the All-American second team. She scored 23 goals as a senior in 2007. She has the eighth-most goals in school history.

International
Windes joined the U.S. senior national team in 2006. In 2007, she scored five goals in the FINA World League Super Final and four goals in the Pan American Games, helping the U.S. to first-place finishes in both tournaments. In 2008, Windes had five goals in the FINA World League Super Final, as the U.S. finished second. She won a silver medal with the U.S. at the 2008 Summer Olympics, scoring one goal.

At the 2009 FINA World Championships, Windes had six goals to help win the gold medal. She then scored five goals apiece during gold medal runs at the 2010 FINA World League Super Final and 2010 FINA World Cup. In 2011, Windes scored three goals in the FINA World League Super Final and four goals in the Pan American Games to help the U.S. earn a berth in the 2012 Summer Olympics. At the Olympics, she won a gold medal with the U.S.

Awards
In 2020, Windes was inducted into the USA Water Polo Hall of Fame.

Personal
Windes was born in Portland, Oregon. She resides in Huntington Beach, California. Her father and sister both played water polo.

See also
 United States women's Olympic water polo team records and statistics
 List of Olympic champions in women's water polo
 List of Olympic medalists in water polo (women)
 List of world champions in women's water polo
 List of World Aquatics Championships medalists in water polo

References

External links
 

1985 births
Living people
Sportspeople from Portland, Oregon
American female water polo players
Water polo centre backs
Water polo players at the 2008 Summer Olympics
Water polo players at the 2012 Summer Olympics
Medalists at the 2008 Summer Olympics
Medalists at the 2012 Summer Olympics
Olympic gold medalists for the United States in water polo
Olympic silver medalists for the United States in water polo
World Aquatics Championships medalists in water polo
Water polo players at the 2011 Pan American Games
Pan American Games medalists in water polo
Pan American Games gold medalists for the United States
California Golden Bears women's water polo players
Medalists at the 2011 Pan American Games
Beaverton High School alumni